Bespalovsky is a rural locality (a khutor) and the administrative center of Bespalovskoye Rural Settlement, Uryupinsky District, Volgograd Oblast, Russia. The population was 528 as of 2010. There are 5 streets.

Geography 
Bespalovsky is located in steppe, 46 km northwest of Uryupinsk (the district's administrative centre) by road. Baltinovsky is the nearest rural locality.

References 

Rural localities in Uryupinsky District